Nawab Bahadur was a title of honour bestowed during Mughal Empire and later during British Raj to Indian Muslim individuals for faithful service or acts of public welfare.

Selected recipients
By Mughal Empire
 1748: Javed Khan Nawab Bahadur (1695–1754), the chief eunuch under Mughal emperor of India, Muhammad Shah.

By British Raj
 1886: Mir Osman Ali Khan (1886–1967), ruler of Hyderabad during 1911–1948.
 1887: Nawab Abdul Latif  (1828–1893), Bengal reformer, was bestowed the title by Viceroy Lord Dufferin on the occasion of Queen Victoria's Jubilee.
 1892: Khwaja Ahsanullah (1846–1901) Nawab of Dhaka.
 1896: Syed Walayet Ali Khan (1818–1899)
 1903: Khwaja Salimullah (1871–1915), Nawab of Dhaka.
 1924: Syed Nawab Ali Chowdhury (1863–1929), Bengali aristocrat, politician, and philanthropist.
 Bahadur Yar Jung (1905–1944), Hyderabadi politician.

See also
 Nawab
 Rao Bahadur

References

Titles in India
Titles in Pakistan
Titles in Bangladesh
Orders, decorations, and medals of British India
Men's social titles